Brewer's duck is an intergeneric hybrid between a mallard and a gadwall. John James Audubon painted a specimen, also referring to it as a Bemaculated Duck, a misspelling of "bimaculated".

References

Anseriformes
Ducks
Intergeneric hybrids